Sourav Kothari (born 16 November 1984) is an Indian player of English billiards. He was world champion in 2018.

Biography 
Kothari was born in Kolkota on 16 November 1984. His father, Manoj Kothari, became the 1990 IBSF World Billiards Champion.

He won the ONGC 13th Asian Billiards Championship 2014,beating Alok Kumar in the final, and a gold medal at the 2017 Asian Indoor Games. 

He was a runner-up to David Causier at the 2017 World Billiards Championship, losing 4–8 in the short format (150-up) final.

Kothari won the World Billiards Championship in 2018 with a 1,134–944 victory over Peter Gilchrist. In the semi-final, Kothari had been more than 500 points behind Causier, before coming back to win.

In 2019 Kothari again reached the world championship final, finishing runner-up by 1,307–967 to Gilchrist. Kothari also won the 2019 Reventon Masters against Johl Younger (6-5) and Reventon Classic against Tyson Crinis (5-1), two tournaments of the Reventon Triple Crown series.

Career highlights 
2017 World Billiards Championship Runner-up (150-up)
2018 World Billiards Champion
2019 World Billiards Championship Runner-up

References

External links
2019 Sourav Kothari v Peter Gilchrist World Billiards Championship final session (YouTube video)

Indian players of English billiards
World champions in English billiards
1984 births
Living people
Cue sports players from West Bengal
Recipients of the Arjuna Award